Henri-Cardin-Jean-Baptiste d'Aguesseau, Marquis d'Aguesseau (23 August 1752, in Paris22 January 1826), grandson of the French chancellor Henri François d'Aguesseau, was advocate-general in the parlement of Paris and deputy in the Estates-General. Under the Consulate he became president of the court of appeal and later minister at Copenhagen. He was elected to the Académie française in 1787.

Works
Of d'Aguesseau's works the most complete edition is that of the eminent lawyer Jean Marie Pardessus, published in 16 vols. (1818–1820); his letters were edited separately by Rives (1823); a selection of his works, (OEuvres choisies, was issued, with a biographical notice, by E Falconnet in 2 vols. (Paris, 1865).)

The far greater part of his works relate to matters connected with his profession, but they also contain an elaborate treatise on money; several theological essays; a life of his father, which is interesting from the account which it gives of his own early education; and Metaphysical Meditations, written to prove that, independently of all revelation and all positive law, there is that in the constitution of the human mind which renders man a law to himself.

See Boullée, Histoire de la vie et des ouvrages du chancelier d'Aguesseau (Paris, 1835); Fr. Monnier, Le Chancelier d'Aguesseau (Paris, 1860; 2nd ed., 1863); Charles Butler, Mem. of Life of H. F. d'Aguesseau, etc. (1830).

Notes

References

1752 births
1826 deaths
Politicians from Paris
French marquesses
Members of the National Constituent Assembly (France)
Members of the Sénat conservateur
Members of the Chamber of Peers of the Bourbon Restoration
Members of the Académie Française